Osteospermum burttianum is a species of plant from South Africa.

Description

Growthform 
This shrublet is densely leafy and hairless.

Leaves 
The hairless leaves are attached directly to the stems and are alternately arranged. They have a distinct midrib and the margins are either finely toothed or rough with small, brownish hairs. They have a leathery texture.

Flowers 
Flowers are most common between December and May. Flowers may, however, be present until August. They are yellow in colour. They grow in solitary capitula and are heterogamous.

They have short. dark-tipped glandular hairs and net-like veination.

The ray florets are female. There are 8-11 of them per flowerhead. The tube lobes are somewhat oval shaped and crested at the tips. They lack a midvein. The ovary is a narrow hairless and two-veined oblong. The style is sterile and tipped with a cone surrounded by a fringe of short hairs.

Fruit and seeds 

Distribution and habitat 
This species is endemic to the Langeberg Mountains in the Western Cape of South Africa. It prefers steep rocky sandstone slopes.

Etymology 
This species is named after B.L. (Bill) Burtt in honour of his contributions to the knowledge of South African phytogeography and the Asteraceae family.

Conservation 
While Osteospermum burttianum does not currently experience any threats, its small range means that it is currently classified as rare by the South African National Biodiversity Institute.

References 

Plants described in 2004
Flora of South Africa
Calenduleae